The name Lisa has been used for nine tropical cyclones worldwide: five in the Atlantic Ocean, one in the Northwestern Pacific Ocean, one in the South-West Indian Ocean and two in the South Pacific Ocean.

In the Atlantic Ocean:
 Hurricane Lisa (1998) – travelled in the central Atlantic without approaching land
 Hurricane Lisa (2004) – formed off Cape Verde and briefly reached hurricane strength near Cape Race, Newfoundland
 Hurricane Lisa (2010) – travelled in eastern Atlantic near Cape Verde
 Tropical Storm Lisa (2016) – formed in eastern Atlantic in close proximity to Cape Verde, churned in the open ocean without threatening land
 Hurricane Lisa (2022) – made landfall in Belize and then re-emerged into the Bay of Campeche as a weak tropical depression

In the Northwestern Pacific Ocean:
 Tropical Storm Lisa (1996) (T9611, 14W) – Made landfall in Southern China

In the South-West Indian Ocean:
 Cyclone Lisa (1981)

In the South Pacific Ocean:
 Cyclone Lisa (1982)

Australian region:
 Cyclone Lisa (1991)

See also
 Tropical Storm Liza, a similar name which was used in the Pacific Ocean.

Atlantic hurricane set index articles
Pacific typhoon set index articles
South-West Indian Ocean cyclone set index articles
Australian region cyclone set index articles